is a Japanese judoka and winner of the 2005 Asian Judo Championships gold medal at the −81 kg category.

Ono is from Ishige, Ibaraki, and has studied Judo alongside Keiji Suzuki since childhood.
After graduating from Tsukuba University, he joined Ryotokuji Gakuen, of which Yusuke Kanamaru, Tomoo Torii, and former Asian champion Yuta Yazaki are also members. He won the all Japanese championships from 2008–2010 and, although the favorite at the Tokyo 2010 World Championships, was eliminated in the 3rd round by former Olympic champion Ilias Iliadis. Ono is renowned for his  uchi mata (inner thigh throw). He is also well known for his Ōuchi gari  (大内刈 major inside leg reap). In 2009–2010, Ono was regarded as one of the most exciting judoka in the world. Despite his popularity, he lost his place in the 2012 Olympics; Japan instead chose Masashi Nishiyama at -90 kg.

References

External links
 
 
 

Japanese male judoka
1980 births
Sportspeople from Ibaraki Prefecture
Living people
Judoka at the 2008 Summer Olympics
Olympic judoka of Japan
Asian Games medalists in judo
Judoka at the 2006 Asian Games
Judoka at the 2010 Asian Games
Asian Games gold medalists for Japan
Asian Games bronze medalists for Japan
Medalists at the 2006 Asian Games
Medalists at the 2010 Asian Games